Mahoroba is an ancient Japanese word describing a far-off land full of bliss and peace. It is roughly comparable to the western concepts of arcadia, a place surrounded by mountains full of harmony and quiet.

Mahoroba is now written only in hiragana as まほろば. The origins of the word are not clear; it is described in a poem in the ancient Kojiki (古事記) as being the perfect place in Yamato:

Note that the Kojiki itself did not use hiragana; the above is a modernized version.

Notes
 The Space Battleship Yamato had a sister-ship that was named Chō Jikū Senkan Mahoroba (The Ultimate Time Sweeper Mahoroba)
 Final Fantasy: Song Book - Mahoroba
 The anime/manga Mahoraba.
 In the anime Kannazuki no Miko, the story takes place in the village of Mahoroba.
 In the game Boktai 3: Sabata's Counterattack, the final boss battle takes place on the moon's capital city of Mahoroba.
 In the game Beatmania IIDX 16: Empress, there is a song called Mahoroba.
 In the game Arcaea, there is also a song called Mahoroba. It is important to note that these are not the same song.
 "The Man-yō Mahoroba Line" became in use for the common name of the West Japan Railway Company (JR West) Sakurai Line on March 13, 2010, the day of the diagram revision of JR Group.
In the game Toukiden 2, the village the player plays in is called Mahoroba Village

Japanese mythology
Mythical utopias